Blanke or Blancke is a surname. Notable people with the surname include:

Blanke
Christa Blanke (born 1948), German theologian and animal rights activist
 Detlev Blanke (1941-2016), an interlinguistics lecturer at Humboldt University of Berlin
 Henry Blanke (1901-1981), a German-born film producer who also worked as an assistant director, supervisor, writer, and production manager
 John Blanke  (fl. 1501–1511), an African musician in England
Thomas Blanke (died 1588), Lord Mayor of London

Blancke 
 Sandrine Blancke (born 1978, Uccle, Belgium), an actress
Wilton Blancké (1980-1971), American diplomat

See also
Blanke (DJ), Australian electronic music producer and DJ

Dutch words and phrases
Dutch-language surnames
German-language surnames
de:Blanke (Begriffsklärung)